Amity, Ohio may refer to:

 Amity, Knox County, Ohio, an unincorporated community
 Amity, Madison County, Ohio, an unincorporated community
 Amity, Montgomery County, Ohio, an unincorporated community

See also
Amity (disambiguation)